The 1961 Gent–Wevelgem was the 23rd edition of the Gent–Wevelgem cycle race and was held on 16 April 1961. The race started in Ghent and finished in Wevelgem. The race was won by Frans Aerenhouts of the Mercier team.

General classification

References

Gent–Wevelgem
1961 in road cycling
1961 in Belgian sport
April 1961 sports events in Europe